The members of the National Assembly of Zambia from 2006 until 2011 were elected on 28 September 2006. Of the 148 members elected on election day, 72 were from the Movement for Multi-Party Democracy, 43 from the Patriotic Front, 26 from the United Democratic Alliance, three from the United Liberal Party and one from National Democratic Focus, as well as three independents. Elections in two seats, Lupososhi and Kabompo East, were postponed due to the death of candidates, with the MMD winning both seats in by-elections.

List of members

Elected members

Replacements by by-election

Non-elected members

References

2006